The 2015 U.S. F2000 National Championship was the sixth season – since its revival in 2010 – of the U.S. F2000 National Championship, an open wheel auto racing series that is the first step in INDYCAR's Road to Indy ladder, and is owned by Andersen Promotions. It was the second season featuring a single class of competition. The schedule expanded to 16 races from 14 in 2014 with the addition of a pair of races at NOLA Motorsports Park and Mazda Raceway Laguna Seca, where the series previously raced in 2013. Nearby Sonoma Raceway was dropped from the schedule.

French second year driver Nico Jamin captured the championship driving for Cape Motorsports with Wayne Taylor Racing. Jamin won ten of the sixteen rounds and finished on the podium of every race except one. American Jake Eidson of Pabst Racing finished on the podium in every race but two, however, he only won four races and Jamin soundly exceeded him for the championship by 72 points. Cape's Aaron Telitz captured one victory among his ten podium finishes and captured third in the championship. Brazilian Victor Franzoni captured a win in the fourth round of the championship, but his team was suspended for repeated equipment rules violations and Franzoni moved to the Pro Mazda Championship. Australian Anthony Martin finished on the podium five times and captured rookie of the year honors.

Drivers and teams
All teams were American-registered.

Race calendar and results

Championship standings

Drivers' Championship

Teams' Championship

Footnotes

References

External links
 

U.S. F2000 National Championship seasons
U.S. F2000 National Championship
2015 in formula racing